John Farquhar is a former professional American football player who played tight end for five seasons for the Tampa Bay Buccaneers, Pittsburgh Steelers, and New Orleans Saints.

After a career in football, John transitioned successfully into a business career. He is now the Chief Executive Officer of HeartFlow Inc., a private healthcare technology company focused on the diagnosis of coronary artery disease.

References

1972 births
American football tight ends
New Orleans Saints players
Pittsburgh Steelers players
Tampa Bay Buccaneers players
Denver Broncos players
Duke Blue Devils football players
People from Stanford, California
Living people
Players of American football from California
Sportspeople from Santa Clara County, California